The 2018 Chatham Cup (known as the ISPS Handa Chatham Cup for sponsorship reasons) is New Zealand's 91st annual knockout football competition.

The 2018 competition will have a preliminary round and four rounds proper before quarter-finals, semi-finals, and a final. The final will be played on 10 September 2018.

Results

Preliminary round
All matches were played on Anzac Day, Wednesday 25 April or Saturday 28 April 2018.

Northern Region

Central Region

Mainland Region

Southern Region

All teams listed below received byes to the first round.
Northern Region: All Lotto Sport Italia NRFL Premier teams
Central Region: Palmerston North Marist
Capital Region: All Capital Football teams
Mainland Region: Nelson Suburbs, Tahuna, Rangers, Cashmere Technical, Coastal Spirit, Ferrymead Bays, Selwyn United, FC Twenty 11, Nomads United, Universities, Burwood, Halswell United
Southern Region: Dunedin Tech, Queenstown Rovers, Green Island, Caversham, Mosgiel, Northern, Otago Uni, Roslyn Wakari, Grant Braes, Geraldine, Thistle (Timaru), West End, Queens Park, Old Boys

Round 1
Round 1 matches took place between 12–13 May 2018.

Northern Region

Central / Capital Region

Mainland Region

Southern Region

All teams listed below received byes to the second round.
Northern Region: Hamilton Wanderers, Western Springs, Onehunga Sports, Glenfield Rovers, Waitakere City, Manukau United, Three Kings United, East Coast Bays, Birkenhead United, Eastern Suburbs, Central United, Bay Olympic
Central Region: Havelock North Wanderers
Capital Region: Wellington United, Stop Out, Wairarapa United, Waterside Karori

Round 2
All matches will be played on Queen's Birthday weekend Monday 4 June 2018.

Northern Region

Capital / Central Region

Mainland Region

Southern Region

Round 3
All matches were played on the weekend of 23–24 June 2018.

Northern Region

Central / Capital Region

Mainland / Southern Region

Round 4
All matches were originally organised to be played on the weekend 14–15 July 2018 however the match between Manukau United and Mt Albert Ponsonby was played on the 21 July 2018 after originally being postponed due to weather conditions.

Northern Region

Capital / Central Region

Mainland / Southern Region

Quarter-finals
The quarter-finals were played between 4–5 August.

Semi-finals
The semi-finals were played on the weekend of 25–26 August 2018.

Final
The final was played on 9 September 2018.

References

External links
Chatham Cup section on the New Zealand Football website 

Chatham Cup
Chatham Cup
Chatham Cup
Chatham Cup
September 2018 sports events in New Zealand